Pragya Singh Thakur (born 2 February 1970), better known as Sadhvi Pragya, is an Indian politician and Member of Parliament representing Bhopal and belonging to the Bharatiya Janata Party. During her college days, she was an active member of Akhil Bharatiya Vidyarthi Parishad (ABVP) and later joined various affiliate organisations of the Rashtriya Swayamsevak Sangh (RSS).

She is an accused in the 2008 Malegaon bombings where 10 people were killed and 82 more were injured. She was arrested on terror charges after her bike was found to be used in the bomb blast. She is currently under trial for multiple charges under the Unlawful Activities (Prevention) Act. In 2017 she was granted bail on health grounds following the dropping of some of the serious charges by the National Investigation Agency.

Thakur contested the 2019 Indian general election from Bhopal constituency, running against Digvijaya Singh of the Indian National Congress, the former Chief Minister of Madhya Pradesh. She won her debut contest by a margin of  votes. According to political scientist Christophe Jaffrelot, she has become the "symbol" of the 2019 election, in which nebulous fringe elements of the Hindutva ideology became mainstream.

On 21 November 2019 Sadhvi Pragya Singh Thakur was made a part of the 21-member parliamentary consultative committee on defence, which is headed by Defence Minister Rajnath Singh. After her comment in parliament, where she called Nathuram Godse (Gandhi's assassin) a patriot, she was criticised by opposition party members. On 28 November, she was removed from the committee on defence as well as BJP parliamentary party meetings.

Personal life
Thakur was born on 2 February 1970. Her father, Chandrapal Singh, was an Ayurvedic practitioner in Bhind, Madhya Pradesh and a worker of Rashtriya Swayamsevak Sangh. She had been a tomboy since her childhood, keeping her hair short, and dressing like a boy. She was often called 'the girl with boyish looks'. She loved riding bikes. It was a motorcycle registered on her name which led to her arrest in connection with the Malegaon blasts.

Cancer treatment 
Cardiothoracic and vascular surgeon Dr. S. S. Rajput of the Dr. Ram Manohar Lohia Institute of Medical Sciences, Lucknow said that Thakur underwent a bilateral mastectomy to prevent recurrence of her cancer in 2008, stating he had operated on her three times. She had been operated twice to surgically remove both her breasts to cure her breast cancer. She was criticised for saying that her breast cancer got cured because of using cow urine and Panchagavya.

Political career 
Thakur studied at Lahar College (Bhind), where, in 1993, she joined Akhil Bhartiya Vidyarthi Parishad (ABVP), the student wing of the Sangh Parivar. She subsequently rose to the position of state secretary and left this organisation in 1997. After that, she worked for Rashtrawadi Sena and the Hindu Jagran Manch. She was also a member of Durga Vahini, women's wing of Hindu organisation Bajrang Dal. She is also a founder member of Vande Mataram Jan Kalyan Samiti, which is an organisation connected to the Rashtriya Swayamsevak Sangh and belongs to the Sangh Parivar.

2019 General Elections
Thakur joined the Bharatiya Janata Party on 17 April 2019 and was declared as the BJP candidate for Bhopal Lok Sabha constituency for 2019 elections. Thakur was in the news for saying that Mumbai former ATS chief Hemant Karkare died in 2008 Mumbai attacks because she cursed him for giving her bad treatment in jail after her arrest in 2008 blasts. BJP leader Fatima Rasool Siddique said her communal and obnoxious remarks have tarnished the image of Shivraj Singh Chouhan and Muslims and she will not campaign for Thakur. Election Commission of India directed the police to file an FIR against Thakur for her Babri Masjid remark that she participated in demolition of the Babri Masjid at Ayodhya in 1992. The Election Commission later banned her for 72 hours from campaigning for violating the Model Code of Conduct by stirring up communal feelings. She was later criticised by BJP party leaders for saying that the killer of Mahatma Gandhi, Nathuram Godse was and always will be a patriot. Nevertheless, Thakur won the election by a margin of  votes defeating opposing candidate Digvijaya Singh, a two-time Chief Minister of Madhya Pradesh. According to political scientist Christophe Jaffrelot, she has become the "symbol" of the 2019 election, in which nebulous fringe elements of the Hindutva ideology have been mainstreamised.

Parliamentary committee on defence
On 21 November 2019 Sadhvi Pragya Singh Thakur has been made a part of the 21-member parliamentary consultative committee on defence, which is headed by Defence Minister Rajnath Singh. After her comment in parliament, where she called Nathuram Godse (Gandhi's assassin) a patriot, she was criticised by opposition party members. On 28 November, she was sacked from the committee on defence as well as BJP parliamentary party meetings.

2008 Malegaon bombings
Following the 2008 Malegaon bombings, in which six people were killed and over 100 injured, Thakur was arrested as one of the prime accused in October 2008 under terrorism charges.

Arrest and trial
Mumbai's Anti Terrorist Squad (ATS) claimed that Thakur formed a group to take revenge for the 2006 Mumbai train bombings and that her motorcycle was used in the bomb blast. This motorcycle was a key evidence in the arrest of Thakur.

On 19 January 2009, Maharashtra Police filed a 4000-page charge sheet for the Malegaon blasts. According to this charge sheet, Lt Col Prasad Purohit was claimed to be the main conspirator who provided the explosives and Thakur arranged the persons who planted the explosive. It was claimed that on 11 April 2008, Thakur and Purohit met in Bhopal wherein both agreed for co-operation in carrying out the blast. However, the charges framed against the Maharashtra Control of Organised Crime Act were dropped for Thakur in July 2009 because Thakur was not proven to be a member of this organised crime syndicate.

Swami Aseemanand in his on-camera confessions named Thakur as one of the key conspirators in the 2008 Malegaon, Ajmer Dargah, and Samjhauta Express terror blasts.

Bail pleas
Thakur had challenged the Bombay High court order of 12 March 2010 rejecting her plea for bail, contending that her arrest violated the mandate of Article 22(1) and 22(2) of the Constitution and also on the ground that no charge sheet was filed within 90 days as contemplated by Section 167(2) of the Code of Criminal Procedure. She contended that she was arrested by the Maharashtra Police's Anti-Terrorism Squad (ATS) from Surat on 10 October 2008, but was brought before the magistrate on 24 October, and thus was in illegal detention for 14 days which violated Article 22(2). On 23 September 2011, the Supreme Court dismissed the bail plea. Dismissing her plea, the bench of Justice JM Panchal and Justice HL Gokhale said "The appellant's contention that she was arrested on October 10, 2008, and was in police custody since then is found to be factually incorrect by this Court. The appellant was arrested only on October 23, 2008, and within 24 hours thereof, on October 24, 2008, she was produced before the Chief Judicial Magistrate, Nasik. As such, there is no violation of either Article 22(2) of the Constitution or Section 167 of Cr.PC."

In 2012 she also filed an application for bail in the Bombay High Court on health grounds, claiming that she has been diagnosed with third-stage breast cancer. On 9 August 2012, she, however, withdrew her application.

In 2014 she again filed an application for bail in the Bombay High Court which was rejected.

In April 2017, she was granted bail by the Bombay High Court on health grounds, following the dropping of charges in under the MCOCA section by the Special National Investigation Agency. She is currently under trial for multiple charges under the Unlawful Activities (Prevention) Act.

Allegations of torture 
Thakur has made, directly or indirectly, several claims about ill-treatment in prison. In August 2014, the Human Rights Commission ordered a probe into Thakur's allegations of torture while in police custody. Subsequently, the case of torture was closed as the panel did not find any evidence to support these claims.

Opinions 
In December 2020, while addressing a gathering of Kshatriya Mahasabha Thakur made a controversial remark. She said that Brahmins don't feel bad when called Brahmin, so do Kshatriyas and Vaishyas. But Shudras do not like to be called as Shudra because of ignorance, they are "unable to understand".

During the COVID-19 pandemic in 2021, Thakur made public remarks addressing BJP party workers in Bhopal claiming that drinking cow urine helps infected people heal from the effects of the virus. "I consumed cow urine daily and it is a kind of acid which purifies my body. It also purifies the lungs and saves me from COVID-19 infection. I don’t take any medicine against corona but I am safe." The purported benefits of drinking cow urine have no scientific backing.

During the 2022 Karnataka hijab row defending the ban on hijab, Thakur said that there is "no need to wear hijab anywhere" and that only those who are "not safe in their houses need to wear Hijab". She also said that there is no need to wear a hijab when in the company of the Hindu community, especially at educational institutions.

She also stated her support for Nupur Sharma for the latter's controversial remarks on Prophet Muhammad.

See also
 Anti Terrorist Squad (India)
 Saffron terror

References

External links

1970 births
Living people
Bharatiya Janata Party politicians from Madhya Pradesh
People charged with terrorism
India MPs 2019–present
National Democratic Alliance candidates in the 2019 Indian general election
Women members of the Lok Sabha
Lok Sabha members from Madhya Pradesh
Indian people imprisoned on charges of terrorism
Indian torture victims
2007 Samjhauta Express bombings
Hindu nationalists
21st-century Indian women politicians